Sultanzade is an Ottoman title for sons of sultana or imperial princesses, female descendants of sovereign in male line. The feminine equivalent is hanımsultan.

Term 
Sultan (سلطان) is a word of Arabic origin, originally meaning "authority" or "dominion" and -zade is a Persian suffix meaning 'son of', 'daughter of', 'descendant of', or 'born of'. Sultanzade literally meaning "descendant of sultan".

Usage in Ottoman family 
In the Ottoman family, sultanzade was used by sons of Ottoman princesses, female descendants of a sovereign in the male line. Different with şehzades, sultanzades were excluded from the Ottoman imperial succession.

The formal way of addressing sultanzades are Sultanzade (given name) Bey-Efendi, i.e. Sir Prince Sultan (given name). Bey (Ottoman Turkish: باي) is a Turkish title for chieftain, traditionally applied to the leaders (for men) of small tribal groups. Effendi, Effendy, or Efendi (Ottoman Turkish: افندي) is a title of nobility meaning a Lord or Master. The official style of sons of sultanzades was simply bey, i.e. sir after their name and daughters of sultanzades was simply hanım, i,e. madam after their name. This all titles are still used by Osmanoğlu family.

Hanımsultan 
The feminine equivalent title is hanımsultan (Ottoman Turkish: خانم سلطان), from the title hanım, Turkish form of the Mongolian title khanum, feminine equivalent of khan or khagan, with the title sultan, Arabic word originally meaning "authority" or "dominion". Hanımsultan is title for daughters of sultana or imperial princesses. The formal way of addressing hanımsultans are (given name) Hanımsultan, i.e. Sultana madam (given name).

Example of sultanzades 
 Sultanzade Mehmed Pasha (1 January 1603 – 1646), son of Ayşe Hanım Sultan (a daughter of Cığalazade Yusuf Sinan Pasha) and great-grandson of Rüstem Pasha and Mihrimah Sultan. Governor of Egypt (1637 – 1640) and later Ottoman Grand Vizier (31 January 1644 – 17 December 1645).
 Sultanzade Mehmed Sabâhaddin Bey (13 February 1879 in Istanbul – 30 June 1948 in Neuchâtel, Switzerland), son of Seniha Sultan, daughter of Abdülmecid I. Ottoman sociologist and thinker. Because of his threat to the ruling House of Osman (the Ottoman dynasty) in the late 19th and early 20th centuries due to his political activity and push for democracy in the Empire, he was exiled.
 Sultanzade Ömer Nami Bey, son of Ayşe Sultan, daughter of Abdülhamid II who was known for publishing her memoirs by the name of Babam Sultan Abdülhamid in 1960
 Sultanzade Maximilian Ali Beyefendi (born London, 15 January 2000), son of Ayşe Gülnev Sultan, great-great-granddaughter of Sultan Mehmed V, the 35th Sovereign of the House of Osman

See also
 List of Ottoman titles and appellations
 Şehzade

References

Ottoman titles